The Houston Area Independent Schools (or HAIS) is a non-profit association of more than 50 private schools located in the Houston, Texas area of the United States.

Member schools

EE-12
 St. Stephen's Episcopal School Houston (Houston)

PreK-12
 The John Cooper School (The Woodlands)
 Covenant Christian School  (Unincorporated Montgomery County)
 The Awty International School (Houston)
 British School of Houston (Houston)
 The Banff School (Unincorporated Harris County)
 The Beresford School (Houston)
 Duchesne Academy of the Sacred Heart (Houston)
 Fort Bend Christian Academy (Sugar Land)
 The Kinkaid School (Hunters Creek Village)
 Lutheran South Academy (Houston)
 Redd School (Unincorporated Harris County)
 Rosehill Christian School (Unincorporated Harris County)
 St. Thomas' Episcopal School (Houston)
 School of the Woods (Houston, Texas)
 Second Baptist School (Houston)
 The Village School (Houston)
 Westbury Christian School (Houston)
 Woodlands Christian Academy (Unincorporated Montgomery County)
 Bay Area Christian School ([League City])

K-12
 The Briarwood School (Houston)
 The Monarch School (Houston)
 St. John's School (Houston)

PK-9
 St. Catherine's Montessori School (Houston)

EE-8
 Honor Roll School (Sugar Land)

PK-8
 Annunciation Orthodox School (Houston)
 The Branch School (Houston)
 Christ Community School Christ Community School] (The Woodlands)
 Clay Road Baptist School (Houston)
 Corpus Christi Catholic School (Houston)
 First Baptist Academy (Houston)
 Grace School (Houston)
 Holy Spirit Episcopal School (Houston)
 Holy Trinity Episcopal School  (Houston)
 Pilgrim Lutheran School (Houston)
 The Post Oak School (Bellaire)
 Presbyterian School (Houston)
 The Regis School of the Sacred Heart (Houston)
 River Oaks Baptist School (Houston)
 St. Anne Catholic School (Houston)
 St. Francis Episcopal Day School (Piney Point Village)
 St. Francis de Sales School (Houston)
 St. Mark's Episcopal School (West University Place)
 St. Mark Lutheran School (Houston)
 St. Theresa Catholic School (Houston)
 St. Thomas More Parish School (Houston)
The Woodlands Methodist School (The Woodlands)

K-8
 Grace School (Houston)
 The Joy School (Houston)

4-8
 Trafton Academy (Houston)

Secondary schools

6-12
 The Emery/Weiner School (Houston)

9-12
 Alexander-Smith Academy (Houston)
 Episcopal High School (Bellaire)
 Incarnate Word Academy (Houston)
 Lutheran High North (Houston)
 Saint Agnes Academy (Houston)
 St. Pius X High School (Houston)
 St. Thomas High School (Houston)
 Strake Jesuit College Preparatory (Houston)

Primary schools

EE-5
 The Parish School (Houston)

PreK-5
 Ascension Episcopal School (Houston)
 Beth Yeshurun Day School (Houston)
 The Fay School (Houston)
 The Shlenker School (Houston)
 Yorkshire Academy (Houston)

External links
 http://houstonprivateschools.org/

Non-profit organizations based in Houston
United States schools associations